The Fault Is Not Yours is a 2019 South Korean drama film directed and produced by Lee Seong-han and written by Lee Seong-han and Jeon Jung. The film is based on the book Yomawari Sensei by Osamu Mizutani.

The film premiered at the Jeonju International Film Festival in May 2019, and was released in South Korea on November 21, 2019.

Cast
 Kim Jae-cheol as Min-jae
 Yoon Chan-young as Joon-young / Ji-geun
 Son Sang-yeon as Yong-joo
 Kim Jin-young as Hyun-jung
 Kim Min-ju as Soo-yeon
 Lee Eun-saem as Mi-ran

Awards and nominations
Kim Min-ju won Special New Actress Award on 30 November 2020 for her excellent portrayal of Sooyeon.

Plot
Minjae is a teacher who feels responsible for dropout students, especially from his past where he fails to protect his students. Soon, he meets four students who are left out from school and their homes.

References

External links
 
 

2019 drama films
2010s Korean-language films
2010s teen drama films
South Korean teen drama films
Films based on non-fiction books
2010s South Korean films